Hosackia oblongifolia, synonym Lotus oblongifolius, is a species of legume native to western North America from Oregon to northern Mexico. It is known by the common name streambank bird's-foot trefoil or meadow lotus. It grows in moist to wet areas in several types of habitat. It is a spreading or upright perennial herb lined with leaves each made up of 3 elongated oval leaflets each up to 2.5 centimeters long. The inflorescence bears several yellow and white flowers between 1 and 2 centimeters long. The fruit is very elongated, reaching up to 5 centimeters in length but just a few millimeters in width.

Plants with copper colored flowers have been separated by some sources as var. cupreus, the copper-flowered bird's-foot trefoil. They are found in the Sierra Nevada slopes of Tulare County, California.

References

External links
Jepson Manual Treatment
USDA Plants Profile
Photo gallery

oblongifolia
Flora of California
Flora of Oregon
Flora of Nevada
Flora of Northwestern Mexico
Flora of the Sierra Nevada (United States)
Flora without expected TNC conservation status